Sinitta! is the debut studio album by British singer Sinitta, released in 1987. It features her biggest and best-known international hit single "So Macho".

Background
In 1987, Simon Cowell, then a talent scout, became closely associated with record producer Pete Waterman and would spend time with Waterman at his PWL studios complex, being mentored by him and learning about the effective running of a successful music business.

Around this time, Cowell was desperate for writing and production trio Stock Aitken Waterman (SAW) to work with Sinitta. "Feels Like the First Time", Sinitta's follow-up single to "So Macho", had charted low (UK number 45) and had only spent 5 weeks on the chart, whereas, in contrast, "So Macho" had been on the UK chart for 28 weeks in 1986, where it had peaked at number 2. Initially Waterman declined to work with Sinitta, claiming that SAW were too busy. In the end though, SAW did work with Sinitta and her first single with the Hit Factory was "Toy Boy".

Singles
In his book, Simon Cowell claims to have come up with the song idea for "Toy Boy", coining the phrase "toy boy" which described older women dating considerably younger guys. However, this is contradicted by writer/producer Mike Stock in his book The Hit Factory: The Stock Aitken Waterman Story as he claims that his inspiration came from the fact that Sinitta herself at the time was dating a younger man.  Whichever way the story goes, "Toy Boy" was a massive hit, reaching number 4 in the UK in July 1987 and staying on the charts for 14 weeks. The song was the 26th best-selling single of 1987 in the UK, selling more than some number ones from that year, including Michael Jackson and Siedah Garrett's "I Just Can't Stop Loving You" and Steve "Silk" Hurley's "Jack Your Body".
  
Two further singles were released from Sinitta!: "GTO" (UK number 15 in December 1987) and "Cross My Broken Heart" (UK number 6 in March 1988).

Track listing

Charts

References

1987 debut albums
Sinitta albums
Albums produced by Stock Aitken Waterman